Mercedes-Benz Arena is a stadium located in Stuttgart, Baden-Württemberg, Germany and home to German Bundesliga club VfB Stuttgart.

Before 1993 it was called Neckarstadion, named after the nearby river Neckar and between 1993 and July 2008 it was called Gottlieb-Daimler-Stadion . From the 2008–09 season, the stadium was renamed the Mercedes-Benz Arena, starting with a pre-season friendly against Arsenal on 30 July 2008.

History
The stadium was originally built in 1933 after designs by German architect Paul Bonatz. After It was built, it was named "Adolf-Hitler-Kampfbahn". From 1945 to 1949 it was called Century Stadium and later Kampfbahn and was used by US Troops to play baseball. The name Neckarstadion was used since 1949.  It is home to VfB Stuttgart in the Bundesliga (and to the Stuttgarter Kickers when they played in the Bundesliga).

After a major refurbishment in the late 1980s and early 1990s partly financed by Daimler-Benz, the Stuttgart town council dedicated the stadium to Gottlieb Daimler. The inventor had tested both the first internal combustion motorcycle and the first 4-wheel automobile there in the 1880s, on the road from Cannstatt to Untertürkheim (now called Mercedesstraße). The new museum, the headquarters and a factory of Mercedes-Benz are nearby.

The stadium capacity was reduced to around 41,000, after one stand (Untertürkheimer Kurve) was demolished during summer 2009 in the process of converting it to a pure football arena. The rebuilt arena was completed in December 2011 with a new capacity of 60,000, including terracing. Due to UEFA regulations, which only allow seating, the capacity is reduced to 54,906 during international football matches.

It is divided into four sections,
 the Haupttribüne (main stands), adjacent to Mercedesstraße, housing VIP-lounges and press seats
 the Kärcher-Tribüne (formerly Gegentribüne, lit: opposite stands), currently named after one of VfB Stuttgart's major sponsors Kärcher
 the Cannstatter Kurve (Cannstatt Curve), to the left of the Haupttribüne, before rebuilding it housed legendary Blocks A and B, which occupied by the most devoted home fans, and one of two video walls. Now die hard home fans stand in the new "heart of Cannstatter Kurve" in Bloks 34 and 35 in the center of the curve directly behind the goal.
 the Untertürkheimer Kurve (Untertürkheim Curve), to the right of the Haupttribüne, housing the guest team's fans (C and D-Block) and the second video wall

The Mercedes-Benz Arena features a unique fabric roof construction, making it easily recognizable. Made of precision-tailored membranes of PVC-coated polyester, the roof tissue is durable enough to withstand 1,000 kg of weight per square decimeter. It is suspended from an aesthetic steel frame that runs around the entire stadium weighing approximately 2,700 metric tons. The steel cables connecting the roof to the frame alone weigh about 420 tons. The roof was added during the refurbishment preceding the 1993 World Athletics Championships.

International matches
The Mercedes-Benz Arena hosted four matches of the 1974 FIFA World Cup, two matches of the 1988 UEFA European Football Championship (a 1st Round match and a semi-final) and six games of the 2006 FIFA World Cup, including a Round of 16 game and the third-place playoff match (see below for details).

The stadium also hosted the finals of the European Cup (now known as UEFA Champions League) in 1959 (Real Madrid vs. Stade de Reims) and 1988 (PSV Eindhoven vs. S.L. Benfica).

Trivia

 As Stuttgart is located relatively close to Germany's southern neighbors Switzerland, it has hosted a total of seven international football matches versus the Swiss since 1911.
 Germany's first international football match after World War II in 1950 (against Switzerland) was played at the stadium. The match attendance of 97.553 is the stadium record. The first match after the German reunification in 1990 (also versus Switzerland) took place at Neckarstadion Stadium as well.
 Klaus Fischer scored Germany's "ARD Goal of the Century" here against the Swiss in 1977, with a bicycle kick ("Fallrückzieher"), his trademark move with which he also scored the important 3:3 equalizer in extra time (108th minute) at the 1982 FIFA World Cup vs France, but this was not among the Top 10 of the WC Goal of the Century.
 With 115 m2 each, the stadium's two video walls before rebuilding were the largest in Europe, now it has the two video walls with the highest resolution in Europe.
 The Gottlieb-Daimler-Stadion was one of the four stadiums hosting games during the 2006 FIFA World Cup whose name were not changed to FIFA World Cup Stadium XYZ, as the dedication to Gottlieb Daimler was not interpreted as advertisement (i.e. for DaimlerChrysler). All others, such as the Allianz Arena in Munich or the AOL Arena in Hamburg were obliged to remove all visual references to their stadiums' name sponsors.

Sports other than football
The 1986 European Athletics Championships in which the hammer throw world record by Yuriy Sedykh was set, and the 1993 World Athletics Championships were held there, and the Daimler-Stadium was the host the IAAF World Athletics final from 2006 to 2008. The arena has also been the venue of several Eurobowl finals of American Football in the 1990s. The last athletics event took place in September 2008, after which the stadium underwent redevelopment in order to build a football-only arena.

Redevelopment

The redevelopment was announced along with the stadium's name change in late March 2008. The first computer images of the new arena were released at the same time, also showing a large cube with four video scoreboards above the centre circle, similar to the one in the Commerzbank-Arena in Frankfurt.

Starting in 2009, the Mercedes-Benz Arena has been redeveloped into a football-specific stadium. New stands were constructed during the summer of 2011, with pitch level being lowered by 1.30 metres in time for the beginning of the 2009–10 season. After the interior redevelopment finished, the roof was expanded to cover all the new rows of the seats. The entire construction was completed by the end of 2011.

Within the first couple of weeks of the redevelopment, 18 undetonated bombs left over from the air raids on Stuttgart during the Second World War were found on the construction site.

International tournaments matches 
All times local (CET)

1974 FIFA World Cup
Stuttgart hosted the following matches at the 1974 FIFA World Cup:

UEFA Euro 1988
These UEFA Euro 1988 matches were played in Stuttgart:

2006 FIFA World Cup 

The following games were played at the stadium during the 2006 FIFA World Cup:

UEFA Euro 2024 
The stadium will host four group stage matches and one quarter-finals match at the UEFA Euro 2024:

Concerts
Pink Floyd performed at the stadium on 25 June 1989 as part of their 1989 Another Lapse European Tour (A Momentary Lapse of Reason Tour).

English rock band Genesis continued their Turn It On Again: The Tour at the stadium in a sold-out crowd of 50,736 fans in attendance.

Depeche Mode performed at the stadium on 3 June 2013 during their Delta Machine Tour, in front of a sold-out crowd of 36,225 people.

References

External links

 Stadium website

Mercedes-Benz
1974 FIFA World Cup stadiums
2006 FIFA World Cup stadiums
Football venues in Germany
Football in Stuttgart
Defunct athletics (track and field) venues in Germany
VfB Stuttgart
Sports venues in Baden-Württemberg
Tensile membrane structures
UEFA Euro 1988 stadiums
UEFA Euro 2024 stadiums
Sports venues completed in 1933
1933 establishments in Germany
Buildings and structures in Stuttgart